Fort Collins Brewery (abbreviated as FCB) was a craft beer brewery located in Fort Collins, Colorado.

History
Fort Collins Brewery was founded on June 1, 1992 by Sandy Jones, Karen Jones. Originally named the H.C. Berger Brewing Company, Fort Collins Brewery had a capacity of 8,840 Barrels and Jesse Angell serving as the head brewer.

The Joneses sold the business in 1996. It was seized from the new owners in 2002 for failure to pay taxes, and the Joneses took it back in August 2003. In 2004, Tom Peters and Jan Peters took over.

In August 2010, the brewery moved and expanded to include a self-owned restaurant called Gravity 1020, which opened on May 12, 2011 for dinner under command of Chef Brian Shaner. Fort Collins Brewery is one of 13 production breweries to include a restaurant. As of 2011, the company employed 60 workers.

Fort Collins Brewery used about 2.5 million gallons of water in 2012.

In the summer of 2017, the land, building and assets of Fort Collins Brewery, but not the brand itself, was purchased by Red Truck Brewing Company which assumed control of the  facility on August 1, 2017 and opened for business on August, 18th, 2018.

Distribution
Fort Collins Brewery beer was found in the following states:
Arizona
Colorado
Illinois
Iowa
Kansas
Montana
Nebraska
New Jersey
New York
North Carolina
Ohio
Pennsylvania
South Carolina
Tennessee
Virginia
Wisconsin
Wyoming

Fort Collins Brewery Beer was also exported to Sweden.

Beers
Full Time Production
Red Banshee, Red Alt Ale
Shot Down, Chocolate Stout
Far Away, IPA
Major Tom's, Pomegranate Wheat

Seasonal Production
Double Down, Gose IPA
Sled God, Winter Warmer
Oktoberfest
Savor Series
Kettle Soured Dark Cherry Imperial
Oud Bruin
Rum Barrel-Aged Imperial Chocolate Stout
 
Retired Brews
Rocky Mt. IPA
Chocolate Stout
Maibock
Hoptitude
Doppel Bock
Double Chocolate Stout
Big Shot
Out of the Ashes Series
Malt Monster Series
Farm Dog, Farmhouse Ale

Awards
Great American Beer Festival Medals: 2006 Bronze for Doppelbock. 2012 Gold for Bambostic, Rauch Bier, 2015 Gold for Oktoberfest  
Red Banshee: 2012 US Open Beer Championship, Silver medal, American Red category
 Bambastic: 2012 Great American Beer Festival, Gold medal, Smoke Beer category

See also
 Barrel-aged beer

References

External links
Company's website

Beer brewing companies based in Colorado
Companies based in Fort Collins, Colorado